Jason Thompson may refer to:

 Jason Thompson (actor) (born 1976), Canadian actor in General Hospital
 Jason Thompson (first baseman, born 1954), former Major League Baseball first baseman
 Jason Thompson (first baseman, born 1971), former Major League Baseball first baseman
 Jason Thompson (basketball) (born 1986), American professional basketball player
 Jason Thompson (figure skater) (born 1989), British figure skater
 Jason Thompson (soccer) (born 1981), American soccer player
 Jason Thompson (writer) (born 1974), American comics writer

See also
 Jason Thomson (born 1987), Scottish footballer